Nicolas Ortíz (born 9 May 1952) is a Puerto Rican boxer. He competed in the men's welterweight event at the 1972 Summer Olympics. At the 1972 Summer Olympics, he lost to Ib Bøtcher of Denmark. At the 1972 Summer Olympics, he lost to Ib Bøtcher of Denmark.

References

1952 births
Living people
Puerto Rican male boxers
Olympic boxers of Puerto Rico
Boxers at the 1972 Summer Olympics
Place of birth missing (living people)
Welterweight boxers